Joliette—L'Assomption—Montcalm was a federal electoral district in Quebec, Canada, that was represented in the House of Commons of Canada from 1935 to 1968.

This riding was created in 1933 from parts of Joliette and L'Assomption—Montcalm ridings.

It was initially defined to consist of:
 the county of Joliette including the city of Joliette;
 the county of L'Assomption; and
 the county of Montcalm, except the township of Archambault.

In 1947, it was redefined to consist of:

 the county of Joliette (except the township of Gouin), and the city of Joliette;
 the county of L'Assomption and the towns of L'Assomption and Laurentides;
the county of Montcalm, except the townships of Brunet, Nantel and Pérodeau and the township of Archambault.

It was abolished in 1966 when it was redistributed into Berthier, Joliette, Labelle and Terrebonne ridings.

Members of Parliament

This riding elected the following Members of Parliament:

Election results

See also 

 List of Canadian federal electoral districts
 Past Canadian electoral districts

External links
Riding history from the Library of Parliament

Former federal electoral districts of Quebec
Joliette